Wangjingnan is a station on Line 14 of the Beijing Subway.  It is located in the south of the Wangjing area in Chaoyang District. The station opened on 28 December 2014.

Future development 
The viaduct for the Capital Airport Express passes over, but does not interchange with, Line 14 at this station. Reserved space for an infill station on Capital Airport Express is under planning.

Station layout 
The station has 2 underground side platforms.

Exits 
There are 3 exits, lettered A, B1, and C. Exit C is accessible.

References

Railway stations in China opened in 2014
Beijing Subway stations in Chaoyang District